In 4-dimensional geometry, the octahedral cupola is a 4-polytope bounded by one octahedron and a parallel rhombicuboctahedron, connected by 20 triangular prisms, and 6 square pyramids.

Related polytopes
The octahedral cupola can be sliced off from a runcinated 24-cell, on a hyperplane parallel to an octahedral cell. The cupola can be seen in a B2 and B3 Coxeter plane orthogonal projection of the runcinated 24-cell:

See also 
 Octahedral pyramid
 Cubic cupola
 Runcinated 24-cell

References

External links
 Segmentochora: oct || sirco, K-4.107 

4-polytopes
Four-dimensional geometry